Edward Herbert, 2nd Earl of Powis, KG (22 March 1785 – 17 January 1848), styled Viscount Clive between 1804 and 1839, was a British peer and Tory politician. He was the grandson of Clive of India.

Early life
Edward was born on 22 March 1785, the son of Edward Clive, 1st Earl of Powis and his wife Henrietta née Herbert. He was one of four children. His younger brother, Robert Henry Clive, was a noted politician. His elder sister, Henrietta, was the wife of Sir Watkin Williams-Wynn, 5th Baronet. His younger sister, Charlotte, was the wife of Hugh Percy, 3rd Duke of Northumberland, and she was famously the governess of the future Queen Victoria.

Edward was educated at Eton and St John's College, Cambridge, graduating as M.A. in 1806 and being awarded LL.D. by the same university in 1835. He also became an honorary D.C.L. from Oxford University in 1844, the year he also became a Knight of the Garter

Peerage and estates
After 1804, when his father was created Earl of Powis, he was known by the courtesy title of Viscount Clive, his father's second title. In 1806, he became a Member of Parliament for Ludlow, retaining the seat until he inherited the earldom and entered the House of Lords.  He was also heir to his uncle George Herbert, 2nd Earl of Powis, who had died unmarried in 1801, and inherited the Powis Castle estates on condition that he assume the name and arms of Herbert only in lieu of those of Clive, which he did by Royal licence on 9 March 1807; other conditions were that he should settle his uncle's large gambling debts and that his father should leave the Clive estates to his younger son, the Robert Henry Clive.

Career
A defender of Church of England interests in Wales, in the Lords he led a successful opposition over 1843 to 1847 to a proposal to unite the sees of Bangor and St Asaph. He was ultimately appointed to a Royal Commission on English and Welsh bishoprics.  A sum of £5,000 raised in testimonial to him was devoted to found the Powis Exhibitions to assist Welsh students at Oxford and Cambridge Universities intending to take holy orders.

Powis had long service in the yeomanry within Shropshire.  In 1807 he was appointed major in command of a troop raised from Ludlow and Bishop's Castle towns, which merged into a larger South Shropshire Yeomanry Cavalry regiment in 1814. He continued under command within the new regiment, to which he succeeded as lieutenant-colonel in 1827. Succeeding his father as Lord-Lieutenant of Montgomeryshire in 1830, Powis played a leading role in the suppression of the Chartist riots of 1839, himself deploying four troops of his own regiment to disperse rioters from Newtown and apprehend some ringleaders while the Montgomeryshire Yeomanry were deployed in other parts of the same county. In addition to his yeomanry regiment, he was colonel commanding the Royal Montgomeryshire Militia from 1846 to his death.

In 1812, as Viscount Clive, he served as treasurer of the Salop Infirmary in Shrewsbury.

The Earl was a bibliophile who built up by 1816 a book collection in Powis Castle sourced from travels in France, purchased partly from booksellers and partly from an auction of Empress Joséphine's library at Malmaison. He was elected to the Roxburghe Club in 1828 and became President in 1835, the year he sponsored their publication of The Lyvys of Seyntys (i.e. The Lives of Saints).

In 1847, he stood for election as Chancellor of the University of Cambridge, but was defeated by only 117 votes by Albert, Prince Consort.

An encourager of canal building in Shropshire and into Montgomeryshire, he was at the time of his death Chairman of the Shropshire Union Railways and Canal Company.

Personal life
On 9 February 1818, Powis married Lady Lucy Graham, the daughter of James Graham, 3rd Duke of Montrose, and they had seven children, five boys and two girls:

 Edward Herbert, 3rd Earl of Powis (1818–1891), who died unmarried.
 Percy Egerton Herbert (1822–1876), who in 1860 married Mary, only child of the Earl of Kerry (himself the eldest son of the 3rd Marquess of Lansdowne). They were the parents of the 4th Earl.
 George Herbert (1825–1894), who married Elizabeth Beatrice Sykes, fourth daughter of Sir Tatton Sykes, 4th Baronet and Mary Anne Foulis (second daughter of Sir William Foulis, 7th Baronet), in 1863.
 Robert Charles Herbert (1827–1902), who married Anna Maria Cludde, only child and heiress of Edward Cludde and Catherine Harriett Cockburn (only daughter of Lt.-Gen. Sir William Cockburn, 6th Baronet), in 1854. He was the grandfather of the 5th and the 6th Earls.
 William Henry Herbert (1834–1909), who married Sybella Augusta Milbank, eldest daughter and coheirss of Mark William Vane Milbank (grandson of William Vane, 1st Duke of Cleveland) and Barbarina Sophia Farquhar (a daughter of Sir Thomas Farquhar, 2nd Baronet), in 1871.
 Lady Lucy Caroline Herbert (d. 1884), who married Frederick Calvert in 1865.
 Lady Charlotte Elizabeth Herbert (d. 1906), who married Hugh Montgomery in 1846.

The Earl of Powis died on 17 January 1848 at Powis Castle after being accidentally shot during a pheasant hunt by one of his sons, Robert Charles Herbert. He was buried at St Mary's Parish Church, Welshpool.

Descendants
Through his second son Percy, he was a grandfather of George Herbert, 4th Earl of Powis, who married Violet Lane-Fox (youngest daughter of Sackville Lane-Fox, 12th Baron Conyers).

References

Bibliography

External links 
 

1785 births
1848 deaths
Earls of Powis
Lord-Lieutenants of Montgomeryshire
People educated at Eton College
Alumni of St John's College, Cambridge
Clive, Edward Herbert, Viscount
Clive, Edward Herbert, Viscount
Clive, Edward Herbert, Viscount
Clive, Edward Herbert, Viscount
Clive, Edward Herbert, Viscount
Clive, Edward Herbert, Viscount
Clive, Edward Herbert, Viscount
Clive, Edward Herbert, Viscount
Clive, Edward Herbert, Viscount
Clive, Edward Herbert, Viscount
Clive, Edward Herbert, Viscount
Clive, Edward Herbert, Viscount
Clive, Edward Herbert, Viscount
UK MPs who inherited peerages
Clive, Edward Herbert, Viscount
Shropshire Yeomanry officers
Edward